This is a list of flag bearers who have represented Libya at the Olympics.

Flag bearers carry the national flag of their country at the opening ceremony of the Olympic Games.

See also
Libya at the Olympics

References

Libya at the Olympics
Libya
Olympic flagbearers
Olympic flagbearers